Sepia plathyconchalis is a species of cuttlefish native to the western Indian Ocean, specifically the Saya-de-Malha Bank, Cargados-Carajos Shoals, and St Brandon Shoals. It lives in shallow waters at depths of between 25 and 63 m.

Sepia plathyconchalis grows to a mantle length of 8 to 63 mm.

The type specimen was collected in the Saya-de-Malha Bank, Indian Ocean. It is deposited at the Zoological Museum in Moscow.

References

External links

Cuttlefish
Molluscs described in 1991